The Gran Canaria Challenger is a professional tennis tournament played on clay courts. It is currently part of the ATP Challenger Tour. It is held in Las Palmas, Spain.

Past finals

Singles

Doubles

References

External links
Official website

ATP Challenger Tour
Clay court tennis tournaments
Tennis tournaments in Spain
Recurring sporting events established in 2021